Scott Edward Spillane (born September 26, 1965) is an American musician. He is part of The Gerbils and was one of the original members of the band Neutral Milk Hotel, for which he also served as a composer. He also has appeared on albums and in live shows by Elephant 6 artists such as The Olivia Tremor Control, of Montreal and Elf Power.

References

The Elephant 6 Recording Company artists
Living people
1965 births
Neutral Milk Hotel members
The Olivia Tremor Control members